ACZ may refer to:
 Acheron language, a Niger–Congo language of Sudan
 Henderson Field (North Carolina) (FAA LID airport code: ACZ), Wallace,  US
 Zabol Airport (IATA airport code: ACZ), Iran